Irene Steer (10 August 1889 – 18 April 1977) was a Welsh freestyle swimmer. She was one of the three Welsh women who have won Olympic gold medals, the others being Nicole Cooke (cycling, 2008) and Jade Jones (taekwondo, 2012, 2016). In 1912, Steer won a gold medal in the 4 × 100 m relay and failed to reach the final of the individual 100 m race.

Steer started as a breaststroke swimmer, but in 1908–1909 changed to crawl. After retiring from competitions she married William Nicholson, director and chairman of Cardiff City F.C. They had three daughters and one son.

See also
 List of Olympic medalists in swimming (women)
 World record progression 4 × 100 metres freestyle relay

References

1889 births
1977 deaths
Welsh female freestyle swimmers
Welsh female swimmers
Olympic swimmers of Great Britain
Swimmers at the 1912 Summer Olympics
Olympic gold medallists for Great Britain
World record setters in swimming
Welsh Olympic medallists
Medalists at the 1912 Summer Olympics
Sportspeople from Cardiff
Olympic gold medalists in swimming